Rondo Hatton (April 22, 1894 – February 2, 1946) was an American journalist and actor. After writing for The Tampa Tribune, Hatton found a career in film due to his unique facial features, which were the result of acromegaly. He headlined horror films with Universal Studios near the end of his life, earning him a reputation as a cult icon.

Early years
Hatton was born in the Kee Mar College girls' infirmary in Hagerstown, Maryland. The family moved several times during Hatton's youth before settling in Tampa, Florida. He starred in track and football at Hillsborough High School and was voted Handsomest Boy in his class his senior year.

In Tampa, Hatton worked as a sportswriter for The Tampa Tribune. He continued working as a journalist until after World War I, when the symptoms of acromegaly developed.  Acromegaly distorted the shape of Hatton's head, face, and extremities in a gradual but consistent process. He eventually became severely disfigured by the disease.  Because the symptoms developed in adulthood (as is common with the disorder), the disfigurement was incorrectly attributed later by film studio publicity departments to elephantiasis resulting from exposure to a German mustard gas attack during service in World War I. Hatton served in combat and served on the Pancho Villa Expedition along the Mexican border and in France during World War I with the United States Army, from which he was discharged due to his illness.

Acting career
Director Henry King noticed Hatton when he was working as a reporter with The Tampa Tribune covering the filming of Hell Harbor (1930) and hired him for a small role. After some hesitation, Hatton moved to Hollywood in 1936 to pursue a career playing similar, often uncredited, bit and extra roles. His most notable of these was as a contestant-extra in the "ugly man competition" (which he loses to a heavily made up Charles Laughton) in the RKO production of The Hunchback of Notre Dame. He had another supporting-character role as Gabe Hart, a member of the lynch mob in the 1943 film of The Ox-Bow Incident.

Universal Studios used Hatton's unusual features to promote him as a horror star after he played the part of The Hoxton Creeper (aka The Hoxton Horror) in the studio's ninth Sherlock Holmes film, The Pearl of Death (1944).  He made two films playing "the Creeper", House of Horrors and  The Brute Man, which were both filmed in 1945 but not released until after his death in 1946.

Death
Around Christmas 1945, Hatton suffered a series of heart attacks, a direct result of his acromegalic condition. On February 2, 1946, he suffered a fatal heart attack at his home on South Tower Drive in Los Angeles. His body was transported to Florida and interred at the American Legion Cemetery in Tampa.

Legacy
Hatton's name — and simple but brutish face — have become recurring humorous motifs in popular culture. In season 6, episode 4 of the 1970s television series The Rockford Files ("Only Rock-n-Roll Will Never Die, part 1"), Jim Rockford, exasperated at a friend who dismisses himself as unattractive, exclaims "You're no Rondo Hatton!" Hatton's physical likeness inspired the Lothar character in Dave Stevens's 1980s Rocketeer Adventure Magazine stories, and in Disney's 1991 film version, The Rocketeer, in which the character is played by actor Tiny Ron in prosthetic make-up.

The 2000 AD comic book character Judge Dredd, who is rarely seen without his helmet, used "face-changing technology" to make himself look like Hatton in issue 52 (18 February 1978) — the first time the character's face was shown unobscured.  The name "Rondo Hatton" was also in a list of suspects obtained by Dredd during the case. As the artist Brian Bolland revealed in an interview with David Bishop: "The picture of Dredd’s face — that was a 1940s actor called Rondo Hatton. I've only seen him in one film." Additionally, the character The Creep in the Dark Horse Presents comic-book series strongly resembled Hatton.

Hatton is regularly name-checked in the novels of Robert Rankin, often referred to as "the now-legendary Rondo Hatton" and credited as appearing in films that are either fictional, or in which he clearly had no part, such as the Carry On films. Rankin's references to Hatton routinely occur in the form of "he had a Rondo Hatton" (hat on).  Another namecheck occurs in Rafi Zabor's PEN/Faulkner-award-winning 1998 novel The Bear Comes Home, where the name is used as a nickname for good-natured but unrefined minor character Tommy Talmo. In the 2004 Stephen King novel, The Dark Tower VII, a character is described as looking "like Rondo Hatton, a film actor from the 1930s, who suffered from acromegaly and got work playing monsters and psychopaths". In the 1991 movie The Rocketeer, actor Tiny Ron Taylor, playing Nazi henchman Lothar, is made up with prosthetics to look like Hatton. The episode of Doctor Who entitled "The Wedding of River Song" features Mark Gatiss as a character whose appearance (achieved through prosthetics) is based on Hatton's, credited under the pseudonym Rondo Haxton for his performance.

A documentary being produced in 2017, Rondo and Bob, and released in 2020, looks at the lives of Hatton and The Texas Chain Saw Massacre art director Robert A. Burns, a self-described expert on Hatton.

The full story of Hatton's life is sensitively told in the Scott Gallinghouse book Rondo Hatton: Beauty Within the Brute (BearManor Media, 2019), which also includes exhaustive production histories of his Universal horror films.

Rondo Hatton Awards; cultural references 
Since 2002, the Rondo Hatton Classic Horror Awards have paid tribute to Hatton in name and likeness. The physical award is a representation of Hatton's face, based on the bust of "The Creeper", whom Hatton portrayed in the 1946 Universal Pictures film House of Horrors.

Filmography

References

Further reading
 "Rondo Hatton". The Tampa Bay Times. September 29, 1923.
 Hatton, Rondo. "Newshounds, Once Doughboys, Describe First Armistice Day: Southeast of Sedan". The Tampa Bay Times. November 12, 1928.

External links
 
 
 The Rondo Hatton Classic Horror Awards
 Rondo Hatton as The Creeper in House of Horrors (TCM's Movie Morlocks)
 

1894 births
1946 deaths
20th-century American male actors
Burials in Florida
Male actors from Tampa, Florida
People from Hagerstown, Maryland
People with acromegaly
Sportswriters from Florida
Sportswriters from Maryland
United States Army personnel of World War I
United States Army soldiers